Sajan Mani (born 1982 in Kunnoth, India) is a Berlin-based contemporary artist and  Berlin Art Prize 2021 winner. He has exhibited at various international venues, including the Vancouver Biennale, the Kampala Art Biennale the Dhaka Art Summit and the Kolkata International Art Festival, on issues of various lives of marginalized people of India and post-colonial Dalit lives. He is working with drawing, performance art and video installations.

Education 
Sajan graduated in English Literature from Kannur University in 2004. Later, he graduated in fine arts from Karnataka State Open University in 2011. He later earned a master's degree in Spatial Strategies in 2019 from Weißensee Academy of Art Berlin.

Biography 
He was an editorial board member for the first edition of the Kochi-Muziris Biennale. He Performed at the Vancouver Biennale, Kampala Art Biennale, Dhaka Art Summit, Kolkata International Performance Art Festival, Sensorium-Sunaparanta Art Festival, Goa and Musrara Mix Festival. Sajan got critically acclaimed for the solo exhibition 'Alphabet of Touch> <Overseas Stretched Bodies and Muted Howls for Songs' exhibited at the Nome Gallery in Berlin.

Important works 

 Citizen Ship Burn It Down!
 Liquidity Ar
 Secular Meat
 Caste-pital
 Politically Incorrect Bodies
 Specters of Communism
 Art will Never Die, but COW?
 Alphabet of Touch> <Over Stretched Bodies and Muted Houses for Songs

Gallery

References 

1982 births
Living people
Indian performance artists
Indian contemporary artists